Delta Geminorum (δ Geminorum, abbreviated Delta Gem, δ Gem), formally named Wasat , is a triple star system in the constellation of Gemini.

Nomenclature
δ Geminorum (Latinised to Delta Geminorum) is the system's Bayer designation.

It bore the traditional name Wasat, which derives from the Arabic word for "middle". In 2016, the International Astronomical Union organized a Working Group on Star Names (WGSN) to catalogue and standardize proper names for stars. The WGSN approved the name Wasat for this star on 21 August 2016 and it is now so entered in the IAU Catalog of Star Names.

From this Chinese name, the name Ta Tsun has appeared.

Properties

Delta Geminorum is a subgiant star with the stellar classification F0 IV. It is about  distant. The estimated age is 1.6 billion years.

It has an apparent visual magnitude of +3.53, allowing it to be seen with the naked eye. It is 0.18 degree south of the ecliptic so it is occasionally occulted by the Sun, Moon and, rarely, by a planet; and is eclipsed by the sun from about 10-12 July. Thus the star can be viewed the whole night, crossing the sky, in mid-January. The last occultation by a planet was by Saturn on June 30, 1857, and the next will be by Venus on August 12, 2420. In 1930, the dwarf planet Pluto was discovered about 0.5° to the east of this star by American astronomer Clyde Tombaugh.

Delta Geminorum is a triple star system. The inner components form a spectroscopic binary with a period of 6.1 years (2,238.7 days) and an orbital eccentricity of 0.3530. A cooler class K companion is not apparent to the naked eye but clearly visible in a small telescope. It orbits the inner pair with a period of 1,200 years and an eccentricity of 0.11. Although according to  its radial velocity is away from the Sun, it is actually approaching the Solar System.

References

External links
 

Geminorum, Delta
Triple star systems
Gemini (constellation)
Wasat
F-type subgiants
035550
0271
Geminorum, 55
2777
056986
BD+22 1645